"Hanky Panky" is a song written by Jeff Barry and Ellie Greenwich for their group, the Raindrops.

A 1964 recording by the Shondells, later reissued in 1966 under the band's new, and more successful, incarnation of "Tommy James and the Shondells," is the best known version, reaching #1 in the United States in 1966.

Song structure and meaning 
Donald A. Guarisco at AllMusic wrote: 

In the Young People's Concert episode titled "What Is a Mode?", Leonard Bernstein explained that the song was composed in the Mixolydian mode.

Composition and history 
Barry and Greenwich authored the song in 1963. They were in the middle of a recording session for their group, The Raindrops, and realized they needed a B-side for their single, "That Boy John". The duo then went into the hall and penned the song in 20 minutes. Barry and Greenwich weren't particularly pleased with the song and deemed it inferior to the rest of their work. "I was surprised when [Tommy James' version] was released," Barry commented to Billboard's Fred Bronson. "As far as I was concerned it was a terrible song. In my mind it wasn't written to be a song, just a B-side." Greenwich has a different recollection of events, stating that the song was written in a car at a lover's lane. Greenwich claimed that while "everyone else was making out, Jeff and I were making music." The single "That Boy John"/"Hanky Panky" was released in November 1963. The song was also recorded by "an obscure R&B girl group", The Summits, in 1963 (as Harmon 1017/Rust 5072), but failed to chart.

Tommy James and the Shondells recorded their first song, "Long Pony Tail," in 1960 and had 500 copies pressed and distributed in southwest Michigan. Jack Douglas, a disc jockey at WNIL in Niles, Michigan, heard the song and asked James if he had other material to record. James had heard "Hanky Panky" being performed by a garage rock band in a club in South Bend, Indiana. "I really only remembered a few lines from the song, so when we went to record it, I had to make up the rest of the song," he told author Fred Bronson. "I just pieced it back together from what I remembered." "Hanky Panky" was released on Douglas' Snap Records in February 1964, selling well in the tri-state area of Michigan, Indiana and Illinois. However, lacking national distribution, the single's popularity quickly faded. James moved on, breaking up The Shondells and finishing high school.

In 1965, an unemployed James was contacted by Snap Records owner Jack Douglas. Pittsburgh disc jockey "Mad Mike" Metrovich. Metrovich had begun playing The Shondells' version of "Hanky Panky", and the single had become popular in that area. The  single had been bootlegged in Pittsburgh, and slightly sped up.  Traveling to Pittsburgh, where realizing he had to form a new Shondells, Mack took him to see several bands in the area. James hired the first decent local band he ran into, The Greensburg, Pennsylvania-based Raconteurs, to be the new Shondells (the original members having scattered).  A debate continues over whether Metrovich or Pittsburgh disc jockey Bob Mack actually broke the single in the area. James credits Mack.  

After appearances on TV and in clubs in the city, James and Mack took a master of "Hanky Panky" to New York City, where Mack sold it to Roulette Records. "The amazing thing is we did not re-record the song," James told Bronson. "I don't think anybody can record a song that bad and make it sound good. It had to sound amateurish like that. I think if we'd fooled with it too much we'd have fouled it up." It was released promptly and took the top position of the U.S. Billboard Hot 100 for two weeks in July 1966.

In 2003, Bob Rivers parodied the song as "Newt Gingrich Does the Hanky Panky".

In 2014, "Hanky Panky" was referenced in the song "Coffee" by Sylvan Esso.

The song was featured in Netflix's  Sex Education and the 2002 horror movie May.

Chart history

Weekly charts

Year-end charts

Notes

See also 
Wipe out

References
Bronson, Fred (2003). The Billboard Book of Number One Hits . . 
"BBC: The Official UK Charts Company". United Kingdom sales chart. Retrieved June 11, 2006.
"Billboard". Billboard Hot 100 airplay and sales charts. Retrieved June 11, 2006.

External links 
 SongFacts Entry
 Song lyrics

1963 songs
1963 singles
1966 singles
Songs written by Ellie Greenwich
Songs written by Jeff Barry
Tommy James and the Shondells songs
Billboard Hot 100 number-one singles
Cashbox number-one singles
RPM Top Singles number-one singles
Roulette Records singles